Buena Vista is a village in the Canadian province of Saskatchewan within the Rural Municipality of Lumsden No. 189 and Census Division No. 6. It is bounded to the west by Regina Beach, demarcated by 16 Street.

History 
Buena Vista incorporated as a village on November 18, 1983.

Demographics 

See also
 List of communities in Saskatchewan
 List of villages in Saskatchewan
 Tourism in Saskatchewan

References

External links

Villages in Saskatchewan
Lumsden No. 189, Saskatchewan
Division No. 6, Saskatchewan